Mikkail Kristopher Crockwell (born February 20, 1990) is a Bermudian footballer, who currently plays for local side Dandy Town Hornets.

Club career
Crockwell played for Dandy Town Hornets and joined St. David's Cricket Club in 2011. He has also played for Bermuda Hogges in the USL Premier Development League and then played 73 matches of US college soccer for Thomas College, where he was voted NAC Defensive Player of the Year in 2012. He graduated in 2014 with a Bachelor of Science Degree in Management.

International career
Crockwell was part of the Bermuda U-15 squad in 2007.

He made his senior debut for Bermuda in a June 2008 friendly match against Barbados and has, as of November 2015, earned a total of 2 caps, scoring no goals. He has represented his country in 1 FIFA World Cup qualification match.

Personal life
Crockwell is a son of Lovette Zuill and has two sisters.

He is a relative of FIFA-certified referee Carlyle McNeil Eugene Crockwell and cricketer Fiqre Crockwell. He is also a Lance-Corporal in the Royal Bermuda Regiment.

References

External links

1990 births
Living people
Association football goalkeepers
Bermudian footballers
Dandy Town Hornets F.C. players
Bermuda Hogges F.C. players
USL League Two players
Thomas Terriers men's soccer players
Bermudian soldiers
Bermuda international footballers